The lighthouse at Fourteen Foot Shoal was named to note that the lake is only  deep at this point, which is a hazard to navigation, ships and mariners.

This light is located at the northern end of Lake Huron, Michigan, US, where it is necessary for boats heading to Chicago to pass through a narrow strait and still avoid shallow water.  The most common path is to go south of Bois Blanc Island (Michigan).  In this channel, the Poe Reef Light marks the northern end of the safe channel and the Fourteen Foot Shoal light marks the southern side of the channel.

History

In 1925 a temporary acetylene buoy was installed there and construction of the permanent light began in 1929 such that the light could begin operation in 1930.

The original light was a fourth-order Fresnel lens. A diaphone fog horn is attached.

Current status and getting there
It is in U.S. Coast Guard District 9, and is still an active aid to navigation.

In 2002 the crew of the Cutter USCGC Mackinaw (WAGB-83) painted and refurbished the light.

The light has been added to the National Register of Historic Places; but is not on the state registry, although it was determined to be eligible by the Michigan State Historic Preservation Office.

A private boat is, of course, the best way to see this light close up.  Short of that, Sheplers Ferry Service out of Mackinaw City offers periodic lighthouse cruises in the summer season.  Its "Eastbound Tour" includes passes by Round Island Light, Bois Blanc Island and Light, Poe Reef Light and Fourteen Foot Shoal. Schedules and rates are available from Shepler's.  Boat narration is provided by the Great Lakes Lightkeepers Association.

A distant view can be had from the Cheboygan Crib Light and the Cheboygan State Park.

On May 15, 2012, the National Park Service made the light available for ownership transfer under the National Historic Lighthouse Preservation Act.

On September 30, 2017, the GSA ended its public auction transferring ownership to the Lake Huron Lighthouse Preservation Society Inc.,  a Michigan nonprofit organization managed by Jerry Persons and Joseph Niewiek.

References

Further reading
 "A Tour of the Lights of the Straits." Michigan History 70 (Sep/Oct 1986), pp. 17–29.
 Lighthouse Central, Fourteen Foot Shoal light The Ultimate Guide to East Michigan Lighthouses by Jerry Roach (Publisher: Bugs Publishing LLC – July 2006). ; .

External links
 
 
 Interactive map on Michigan lighthouses. Detroit News
 Interactive map, pictures, descriptions of Northern Lake Huron lights.
 Lighthouses in the Mackinac Straits.
 Terry Pepper, Seeing the Light, Fourteen Foot Shoal Light.

Lighthouses completed in 1929
Houses completed in 1929
Lighthouses on the National Register of Historic Places in Michigan
Buildings and structures in Cheboygan County, Michigan
National Register of Historic Places in Cheboygan County, Michigan